James Berkeley Larsen (February 27, 1889 – March 30, 1979) was a Republican politician from Idaho. He served as the 30th lieutenant governor of Idaho from 1955 to 1959 during the administration of Governor Robert E. Smylie.

References 

Idaho Republicans
Lieutenant Governors of Idaho
1889 births
1979 deaths
20th-century American politicians